Cristian Marcelo Urzúa Gac (born 9 September 1962), known as Marcelo Urzúa, is a Chilean former footballer who played as an attacking midfielder for clubs in Chile and abroad.

Career
In his homeland, he played in the top division for Magallanes (1982), Colo-Colo (1983), Universidad de Chile (1983), Palestino (1984–85) and Rangers (1986) before moving abroad.

As player of Colo-Colo, he made one appearance in the 1983 Copa Libertadores match against Cobreloa on 23 March and took part in the 1983 Copa Polla Gol. On second half of the same year, he switched to the traditional rival, Universidad de Chile, becoming the seventh player to make it after Alfonso Domínguez, Javier Mascaró, among others.

In 1987, he went to Europa thanks to the Argentine former player of Palestino, José Rubulotta, who also helped another Chilean players to sign in Belgium such as Juan Verdugo, Eloy Vidal and Juvenal Olmos. He played for Eendracht Aalst (1987–88) in Belgium, and for Diagoras (1988–89) in Greece.

After a stint in Chile with Naval (1989–1990), he returned to Europa and played for the German club Concordia Hamburg in 1990–91.

References

External links
 
 Marcelo Urzúa at PlaymakerStats.com
 

1962 births
Living people
Place of birth missing (living people)
Chilean footballers
Chilean expatriate footballers
Chilean Primera División players
Deportes Magallanes footballers
Magallanes footballers
Colo-Colo footballers
Universidad de Chile footballers
Club Deportivo Palestino footballers
Rangers de Talca footballers
Naval de Talcahuano footballers
Challenger Pro League players
S.C. Eendracht Aalst players
Super League Greece players
Diagoras F.C. players
NOFV-Oberliga players
SC Concordia von 1907 players
Chilean expatriate sportspeople in Belgium
Chilean expatriate sportspeople in Greece
Chilean expatriate sportspeople in Germany
Expatriate footballers in Belgium
Expatriate footballers in Greece
Expatriate footballers in Germany
Association football midfielders